A melanomorph is a substance related to the pigment melanin.  Melanomorphs  originate from the aromatic amino acids tyrosine, tryptophan, and phenylalanine.  They tend to absorb ultraviolet-B light, with peaks around 280 nanometers.  See also Beer's Law.

References
Organic Chemistry 5th Ed. Bruice
http://www.textbookslist.com/sciences/organic-chemistry-5th-edition-paula-y-bruice.html

Biochemistry